Colonel Henry Lysons VC CB (30 July 1858 – 24 July 1907) was a British recipient of the Victoria Cross, the highest and most prestigious award for gallantry in the face of the enemy that can be awarded to British and Commonwealth forces.

Details
Lysons was 20 years old, and a lieutenant in the 2nd Battalion, 90th Regiment of Foot, British Army during the Anglo-Zulu War when the following deed took place for which he was awarded the VC.

On 28 March 1879 at the Hlobane Mountain, South Africa, Lieutenant Lysons, with a captain and a private (Edmund John Fowler) dashed forward in advance of the party which had been ordered to dislodge the enemy from a commanding position in natural caves up the mountain. The path was so narrow that they had to advance in single file and the captain who arrived first at the mouth of the cave was instantly killed. Lieutenant Lysons and the private, undeterred by the death of their leader, immediately sprang forward and cleared the enemy out of their stronghold.

Further information
He later achieved the rank of colonel. His Victoria Cross is displayed at the Cameronians Regimental Museum, Hamilton, Lanarkshire, Scotland

References

External links
Location of grave and VC medal (Gloucestershire)

1858 births
1907 deaths
People from Morden
People educated at Wellington College, Berkshire
Cameronians officers
British recipients of the Victoria Cross
Companions of the Order of the Bath
Anglo-Zulu War recipients of the Victoria Cross
British Army personnel of the Mahdist War
Royal Fusiliers officers
Bedfordshire and Hertfordshire Regiment officers
British Army personnel of the Anglo-Zulu War
British Army recipients of the Victoria Cross